Hecht-Hill-Lancaster was a production company formed by the actor Burt Lancaster in association with his agent, Harold Hecht, and James Hill. In 1948 Lancaster and Hecht formed Norma Productions (named after his wife), which later became Hecht-Lancaster. Hill joined in the mid-1950s. The company produced some of the most notable American films of the 1950s.

In 1956 they renewed their deal with United Artists. In late 1957 they announced they would make ten films worth $14 million in 1958.

Filmography 

Kiss the Blood Off My Hands (1948), N
The Flame and the Arrow (1950), N
Ten Tall Men (1951), N
The Crimson Pirate (1952), HL
Apache (1954), HL
Vera Cruz (1954), HL
Marty (1955), HL
The Kentuckian (1955), HL
Trapeze (1956), HHL
The Bachelor Party (1957), HHL
Sweet Smell of Success (1957), HHL
Run Silent, Run Deep (1958), HHL
Cry Tough (1958), C
Separate Tables (1958), HHL
Take a Giant Step (1959), HHL
The Rabbit Trap (1959), C
Summer of the Seventeenth Doll (1959), HHL
The Devil's Disciple (1959), HHL
The Unforgiven (1960), HHL
The Young Savages (1961)
Birdman of Alcatraz (1962), N

Key
HL = Hecht-Lancaster 
HHL = Hecht-Hill-Lancaster 
N = Norma Productions 
C = Canon Productions

Unmade films 

Bandoola
Colonel Redl
First Love
The Dreamers
Tall Dark Man
The Hitchhiker
The Catbird Seat
Tell It on the Drums
The Rock Cried Out
Kimberley
Blaze of the Sun

References 

Film production companies of the United States
Norma Productions